David Seymour Latchman CBE (born 1956) is a British geneticist and university administrator. Since 2003 he has been Vice-Chancellor of Birkbeck, University of London, and since 1999 professor of genetics at University College London.

Born into a Jewish family, he is nephew and heir to the childless wealthy property developer Maurice Wohl and is chair of the Maurice Wohl Charitable Foundation, with over £75 million in assets which has given over £5 million to Birkbeck. Latchman was educated at The Haberdashers' Aske's Boys' School and received his doctorate from the University of Cambridge before undertaking postdoctoral research at Imperial College London and in the Department of Biology at University College London. He worked in the Medical Molecular Biology Unit at UCL, and Middlesex School of Medicine. He has been Professor of Molecular Pathology and Director of the Windeyer Institute of Medical Science at UCL and was Dean of the Institute for Child Health (1999–2002).
He serves on several Committees including London Development Agency (observer status); Universities UK Research Policy Network; National DNA Database Ethics Group; London First Board member.

As Master of Birkbeck, he has voiced protest at UK government proposals to cut funding for second degrees. Latchman is a vocal advocate for part time degrees and government support to improve access for adults to higher education.

Latchman was appointed Commander of the Order of the British Empire (CBE) in the 2010 Birthday Honours for services to higher education.

In early 2017 it was announced he was facing investigation for research misconduct. In 2018, the Daily Telegraph reported that the enquiry launched in 2017 had found two scientists at the Institute guilty of misconduct by manipulating images in seven published research papers in which Latchman was also listed as an author. On 1 July 2019 it was reported by the Guardian and Buzzfeed news that a research misconduct claim against Latchman had been upheld and that he had been "reckless" in his running of the lab and co-authoring on the research. In February 2020 Professor John Hardy, a fellow of the Royal Society had said that "He [Latchman] should be fired from UCL and Birkbeck", and that Professor Gudrun Moore, a geneticist at UCL, said "I was surprised that he [Latchman] did not resign". The outcome of a final UCL hearing came to a close after two investigations into the publications from the research group at UCL, finding that Professor Latchman’s management of his UCL research programme was not at fault and that he “had no knowledge of, or involvement in, the image manipulation identified”. On 9 February, Birkbeck University as an independent institution within the University of London, showed their support publicly by announcing in a letter to the Guardian and on the official university website, that following the hearing and investigations, it found Professor to be “a successful master of Birkbeck” with whom they “have full confidence in his integrity and competence”. To date 6 papers have been retracted and 2 papers have been corrected.

References

External links

Latchman's recent scientific papers
Inaugural lecture

1956 births
Living people
British Jews
Jewish scientists
Alumni of the University of Cambridge
People educated at Haberdashers' Boys' School
British geneticists
Masters of Birkbeck, University of London
Academics of Birkbeck, University of London
Academics of University College London
Commanders of the Order of the British Empire
Fellows of King's College London